Myung Sung Presbyterian Church is the largest Presbyterian church in the world. It is located in Myung-il-dong, Seoul, South Korea, with its Prayer Sanctuary in Wonju. Myung Sung Presbyterian Church has over thirty church plants, including Myung Sung First Presbyterian Church, founded in 2004, and Myung Sung Second Presbyterian Church, founded in 2006. There are an additional ten "screen" (video) churches. The founder and current senior pastor of the church is Dr. Kim Sam Whan.

History 
Myungsung literally means "Voice (Sung in Korean) of Myungil-dong" (now Myeongil-dong). The church was founded in 1980. Because there were many farms and orchards around the church, it had been renovated and developed into a huge  housing complex by the mid 1980s. In 1989, Myungsung Presbyterian Church was rebuilt on its current site, with a scale of almost 8754 m². In 1990, the senior pastor, Dr. Kim Sam Whan (김삼환), from Myungsung Church visited the Soviet Union (now Russia), and Poland for worship missions, as the first among the Protestant pastors in South Korea. In 2004, the church opened its affiliated hospital named MCM (Myungsung Christian Medical Center) in Addis Ababa, Ethiopia, to serve untreated local people there. In 2012, a new main sanctuary was built beside the former building.

The church mottos are "Lord Only" and "Seven Year as One Day".

Mission Department 
As of 2006 the Myungsung Mission Department has been able to support 56 nations through 92 families and 172 missionaries. Myungsung Church also supports small churches, schools, hospitals, community centers, and future leaders.

References

External links
 http://www.msch.or.kr

Gangdong District
Presbyterian megachurches
Christian organizations established in 1980
20th-century Presbyterian churches
Presbyterian churches in Seoul